Christina Steinbrecher-Pfandt (born 1983) is an international art curator and director, and co-founder together with Micha Anthenor Benoliel of Blockchain.art, a digital platform for artists and collectors. She was part of the founding team that rebranded Austria’s biggest contemporary art fair, viennacontemporary.

Personal life 
Christina Steinbrecher was born in Kazakhstan to German-Ukrainian parents, and speaks German, Russian and English, fluently. She moved to Cologne, Germany in 1990 where she attended . She studied international business at Maastricht University, Netherlands. Afterwards, she received her master of science in contemporary art from Sotheby's Institute of Art in London, where she majored in Moscow Contemporary Arts in the 1990s. She is married to Stefan Oliver Pfandt. Together, they have two daughters.

Career 

In 2008, Steinbrecher-Pfandt moved to Moscow, Russia to run Volker Diehl Gallery.

In 2008, she helped to realize the Jeremy Deller show From One Revolution to Another, held at Palais de Tokyo. That same year, she co-curated the show Laughterlife with Maria Baibakova.

In 2009, she became artistic director of Art Moscow Art Fair, heading the fair until 2012.

From 2009 to 2012, Steinbrecher-Pfandt curated art shows and art directed projects throughout Europe and Russia including, Venice Biennale, Moscow Biennale, Artbat Fest, and for the Innovation Prize of the National Centre for Contemporary Arts.

In 2013, she curated the exhibition Rhythm Assignment at the Bonnefantenmuseum.

In 2012, she and Vita Zaman (until 2014) were named artistic directors of VIENNAFAIR.  Two years later, the duo together with the managing director Renger van den Heuvel helped rebrand VIENNAFAIR as viennacontemporary and moved the annual exhibition to the historic market hall, Marx Halle. In 2016, Steinbrecher-Pfandt took the helm, expanding the fair’s international presence. She is credited with sharpening the fair’s profile and for positioning it as the “gateway to the East”. In 2018, Steinbrecher-Pfandt was named “40 under 40” by Apollo magazine for her role in advancing contemporary art in Vienna. Later that year, she resigned from viennacontemporary and moved to San Francisco to help bridge the gap between art and tech with the launch of Blockchain.art.

In 2019 she began serving in an advisory role to the festival Ars Electronica. She sits on the boards of the Armenia Art Foundation, the Ural Industrial Biennial of Contemporary Art, Artbat Fest, and CADAF Fair, as well as giving talks about art in the digital age.

References 

Blockchain art
Maastricht University alumni
1983 births
Living people
German people of Russian descent
German art curators
German women curators